Pusher II (also known as Pusher II: With Blood on My Hands) is a 2004 Danish crime film written and directed by Nicolas Winding Refn. It is the second film in the Pusher trilogy, portraying the lives of criminals in Copenhagen.

Plot
The film opens some time after the original film with Tonny serving out his last day of a prison sentence. His cell-mate delivers a monologue advising Tonny to conquer his fear. He then reminds Tonny that he owes him money, but has chosen to give him more time out of respect for Tonny's father, the Duke, a vicious gangster. Upon his release, Tonny visits his father's garage business seeking employment. The Duke has a younger son from a different mother now and receives Tonny coldly, but he ultimately allows Tonny to work for him on a trial basis. Tonny steals a Ferrari in an effort to impress his father, but the car is rejected and the Duke berates Tonny mercilessly for his lack of responsibility. 
 
While hanging out with his friend Ø, Tonny is told that he has a child with a local woman Charlotte. Charlotte has raised the child by herself so far and demands that Tonny start paying her child support. Tonny makes empty promises to pay, but soon comes to care for the child. Tonny successfully participates in a car heist for the Duke, but is forced to ride in the trunk of the escape car because there are no seats left.

Tonny helps a local pimp and hoodlum, "Kurt the Cunt", make a heroin deal with Milo, the drug lord from the first film. When one of Milo's thugs arrives late, a spooked Kurt flushes the heroin down the toilet. Kurt now has no money or drugs to sell and cannot pay back the money he borrowed for the deal. Kurt convinces Tonny to help buy him a gun and shoot him in the arm to convince Kurt's backers that he was robbed. While visiting with Charlotte and his son, Tonny learns how to change his son's diaper. Ø watches and reveals that he is about to marry his girlfriend Gry and have a child of his own.

At Ø's wedding reception, the Duke delivers a toast telling Ø that he thinks of him as a son, and then chides Tonny. Tonny gets drunk and becomes angry as he watches Charlotte neglecting their child to snort cocaine with Gry in the club's kitchen. He insists that she take the baby home, but she refuses by berating and humiliating Tonny. Enraged, Tonny attacks Charlotte before several men pull him away. Realizing that he has once again made a fool of himself, Tonny leaves the party and meets Kurt, who is lingering outside. Kurt convinces Tonny to help him smash up his apartment to further support their story. In return Kurt promises to put in a good word for Tonny with the Duke. After Kurt attacks a prostitute that emerges from his bedroom, he tells Tonny he is going to finish her off and Tonny, wanting no part of it, leaves. Kurt reveals that his financial backer is the Duke and that he has lied so that Tonny will share in Kurt's debt.

Tonny visits his father to find a way to reconcile and pay off his debt. Tonny volunteers to intimidate the Duke's ex-wife Jeanette, who is trying to take custody of his young half-brother, to force her to drop the custody claim. The Duke is hesitant to give the job to Tonny, but his brother Red vouches for Tonny because he did well during the car heist. The Duke insists that Tonny kill Jeanette, and he agrees. Tonny visits Jeanette where she works, at Kurt's brothel, but he cannot go through with the murder. After returning and admitting his failure to his father, the Duke berates him savagely. Tonny snaps and viciously stabs the Duke to death. He flees and goes looking for Ø, but instead finds Gry and Charlotte getting high. They deride Tonny and then leave the baby unattended. Tonny takes the child and gets on a bus, fleeing the city. The film ends with a shot of the tattoo on the back of Tonny's head which reads "Respect".

Cast
 Mads Mikkelsen as Tonny: A troubled hoodlum.
 Leif Sylvester as Smeden, aka The Duke: A notorious gangster and Tonny's estranged father.
 Anne Sørensen as Charlotte: A prostitute and the mother of Tonny's child.
 Øyvind Hagen-Traberg as Ø: Tonny's friend and the Duke's trusted employee.
 Kurt Nielsen as Kurt the Cunt: An untrustworthy pimp and drug dealer.
 Karsten Schrøder as Red: The Duke's brother and partner.
 Maria Erwolter as Gry: Ø's girlfriend.
 Zlatko Burić as Milo: A Serb drug lord.
 Ilyas Agac as Muhammed: An immigrant criminal and gun dealer.
 Linse Kessler as Jeanette: A prostitute and the Duke's ex-wife.
 Sven Erik Eskeland Larsen as Svend
 Maya Ababadjani as Prostitute #1

Reception
The film holds a score of 100% on Rotten Tomatoes, with an average rating of 7.55/10 based on 10 reviews from critics. Metacritic gave an average score of 78 out of 100, indicating "generally favorable reviews".

Soundtrack

The soundtrack was composed by Peter Peter, in collaboration with Peter Kyed and performed by Peter Peter's band The Bleeder Group. The soundtrack uses an updated version of the "Pusher theme" composed by Peter Peter and Povl Kristian for the first film. Nicolas Winding Refn arranged a competition, the "Pusher II Soundtrack Hunt", in collaboration with GAFFA and the website Mymusic, to find diegetic music to use in the film. Among the tracks chosen was Sad Disco by Keli Hlodversson.

Sequel

Pusher II is the second film in a trilogy of Pusher films written and directed by Refn. Each film takes place in the same fictional Copenhagen underworld. The original Pusher follows Tonny's original partner Frank (Kim Bodnia), and his desperate attempt to raise money after a drug deal gone wrong. Pusher II references the events of this film several times. Charlotte comments on the scars on Tonny's head, a result of the beating he received from Frank. Milo later asks Tonny if he has seen Frank lately, as Milo wanted to kill Frank at the end of Pusher. This comment reveals that Frank disappeared after the events of that film, but it's not mentioned if he fled or he was killed.

The third film in the trilogy is Pusher 3, which follows the Serbian drug lord Milo as he struggles with his drug addiction, several bad drug deals, and his daughter's birthday celebration.

A Hindi remake of the first film was released in 2010, while an English language remake was released in 2012.

References

External links
 
 
 

Pusher (film series)
2004 crime thriller films
2004 films
British crime thriller films
Danish crime thriller films
Films about organized crime in Denmark
Gangster films
Films about the illegal drug trade
Films directed by Nicolas Winding Refn
Films shot in Denmark
Films set in Copenhagen
Vertigo Films films
2000s Danish-language films
2000s British films